The Secret River is an Australian television drama screened on ABC in June 2015. This two-part miniseries is based on the novel of the same name written by Kate Grenville. It follows the story of young couple, William and Sal Thornhill, who are transported to the new colony of New South Wales in 1805, giving a look into the colonisation of Australia and the escalating conflict between the original Indigenous inhabitants and the newly arrived white convicts and settlers.

Cast
 Oliver Jackson-Cohen as William Thornhill
 Sarah Snook as Sal Thornhill
 Lachy Hulme as Thomas Blackwood
 Tim Minchin as Smasher
 Samuel Johnson as Saggity
 Trevor Jamieson as Gumang
 Huw Higginson as Alexander King
 Rhys Muldoon as Lord Loveday
 Rory Potter as Willie Thornhill
 Finn Scicluna-O'Prey as Dickie Thornhill
 Genevieve Lemon as Mrs. Herring

References

External links
 

2015 Australian television series debuts
2015 Australian television series endings
APRA Award winners
Australian Broadcasting Corporation original programming
English-language television shows
Television shows set in colonial Australia
Indigenous Australian television series